Arthur Ashe and Marty Riessen were the defending champions but none could compete this year, as both players were banned for the Grand Prix tournaments during the dispute between the ILTF and the WCT.

Bob Hewitt and Frew McMillan won the title by defeating Patricio Cornejo and Jaime Fillol 6–3, 8–6, 3–6, 6–1 in the final.

Seeds
The top seven seeds received a bye to the second round.

Draw

Finals

Top half

Section 1

Section 2

Bottom half

Section 3

Section 4

References
 Official results archive (ATP)
1972 French Open – Men's draws and results at the International Tennis Federation

Men's Doubles
French Open by year – Men's doubles
1972 Grand Prix (tennis)